Bundwan Polytechnic is a government polytechnic located in Bandwan, Purulia, West Bengal. This polytechnic is affiliated to the West Bengal State Council of Technical Education,  and recognized by AICTE, New Delhi. This polytechnic offers diploma courses in electrical and mechanical engineering.

Education 
Bundwan Polytechnic Polytechnic is under the West Bengal State Council of Technical Education board and All India Council for Technical Education approved.

Semester examination held in December (odd semester) and in June (even semester) every year.

This institute offers diploma degree in the branches mentioned below:

Library and centers 
In the college there is a library, study facility, language room, common room and seminar hall.

Admission procedure 
Aspirants must appear for the JEXPO entrance test. Qualified students can select the institute by attending counseling. In JEXPO entrance test there are three subjects: physics, chemistry, mathematics.

References

External links 
http://bndpoly.in/

Universities and colleges in Purulia district
Technical universities and colleges in West Bengal
2009 establishments in West Bengal
Educational institutions established in 2009